The Vilcabamba mountain range is located in the region of Cusco, Peru, in the provinces of Anta, La Convención and Urubamba. It extends between 13°10' and 13°27'S. and 72°30' and 73°15'W for about 85 km. Its highest peak is Salcantay, which is 6,271 m (20,574 ft) above sea level.

Toponyms 
Most of the names in the range originate from Quechua. They used to be spelled according to a mainly Spanish-based orthography which is incompatible with the normalized spellings of these languages and Law 29735 which regulates the 'use, preservation, development, recovery, promotion and diffusion of the originary languages of Peru'. According to Article 20 of Decreto Supremo No 004-2016-MC (Supreme Decree) which approves the Regulations to Law 29735, published in the  official newspaper El Peruano on July 22, 2016, adequate spellings of the toponyms in the normalized alphabets of the indigenous languages must progressively be proposed with the aim of standardizing the namings used by the IGN. The IGN realizes the necessary changes in the official maps of Peru.

Hints to wrong spellings are terms containing hua and hui (instead of wa and wi), "e", "o", "ca", "cu", "qu"  or diphthongs among others.

Etymology 
The name Vilcabamba possibly comes from Aymara and Quechua willka: a species of tree, or a local God; and pampa: flat terrain, plain.

Mountains 
Other mountains are listed below:

 Pumasillo, 
 Tucarhuay, 
 Padreyoc, 
 Panta,  
 Choquetacarpo, 
 Humantay 
 Huayanay 
 Pucapuca, 
 Soray, 
 Paljay, 
 Amparay, 
 Corihuayrachina, 
 Yanama, 
 Jatunjasa, 
 Soirococha,  
 Azulcocha, 
 Kaiko,  
 Chaupimayo, 
 Paccha, 
 Coisopacana  
 Moyoc  
 Choquesafra, 
 Ocobamba  
 Cayco,  
 Pumasillo,  
 Yanajaja, 
 Pitupaccha, 
 Nañuhuaico,  
 Yanacocha,  
 Quenuaorco,  
 Chuchaujasa, 
 Mandorcasa, 
 Llamahuasi, 
 Jatun Huamanripa, 
 Qiwiñayuq, 
 Khallkaqucha, 
 Yanaorjo, 
 Yanama, 
 Incahuasi,

References

Mountain ranges of Peru
Mountain ranges of Cusco Region